Michelle  Rojas (née Pennington; born December 16, 1987) is an American voice actress from Dallas, Texas. Affiliated with Funimation and Bang Zoom! Entertainment, some of her major roles are Tohka Yatogami in Date A Live, Zuikaku in Azur Lane, Kanade Sakurada in Castle Town Dandelion, Mikoto Sakuragawa in Gonna be the Twin-Tail!!, Kō Yagami in New Game!, Nashiro Yasuhisa in Tokyo Ghoul, Maya Sato in Classroom of the Elite, Toka Yada in Assassination Classroom, Shion in That Time I Got Reincarnated as a Slime and Roxy Migurdia in Mushoku Tensei: Jobless Reincarnation.

Personal life 
Rojas married former Funimation social media manager Justin Rojas. Rojas is non-binary and uses she/her and they/them pronouns. Rojas has a son.

Filmography

Anime

Animation

Film

Video games

Notes

References

External links

American voice actors
Living people
Actors from Dallas
1987 births
21st-century American actors
American video game actors
American television actors
University of North Texas alumni
Funimation
People from Denton, Texas
Navarro College alumni
People from Navarro County, Texas
American voice directors
American non-binary actors
LGBT people from Texas